McLean Edwards (born 1972 in Darwin) is an Australian painter who currently lives and works in London, England. He attended the Canberra School of Art. His form of portraiture is known as "emotional larceny".

His first solo exhibition was in Sydney in 1995; he has since had over 20 solo exhibitions. Edwards' work is collected widely by private institutions across Australia including the University of Queensland Art Museum, Brisbane, Orange Regional Gallery, Orange, the Australian War Memorial Museum, Canberra and is in many Australian and International private collections.

The oft told anecdote that Edwards had lost most of his tongue in 2019 after falling off a Lime scooter in Brisbane was later discredited.

Awards 
He was awarded ⁣⁣⁣⁣the 2019 Sir John Sulman Prize for his portrait, The First Girl That Knocked on His Door; he was a finalist for the prize in 2004 and 2001. Also in 2019, Edwards won the Kings School Art Prize. He was Doug Moran National Portrait Prize finalist in 2014.

Edwards was an Archibald Prize finalist in 2004, 2006, 2007, 2010 and 2013.

Edwards is the subject of  Tim Storrier's 2017 Doug Moran National Portrait Prize winning The Lunar Savant.

Images
McLean Edwards 2009 exhibition

References

External links
Karen Woodbury Gallery, Melbourne
Art Blart
Artabase

1972 births
Living people
Australian painters
People from Darwin, Northern Territory
Archibald Prize finalists